John Brewer Wight (March 2, 1853 – March 31, 1923) was the eighth president of the Board of Commissioners of the District of Columbia, serving from 1898 to 1900.

Early life
John Brewer Wight was born on March 2, 1853, in Washington, D.C. to Mary Isabella (née Buchanan) and Otis Caleb Wight. He attended Rittenhouse Academy.

Career
Wight was Supervisor of Gallaudet College and later entered the real estate and insurance businesses. He was one of the first secretaries of the Washington Board of Trade. He served on the Board of Commissioners of the District of Columbia for two terms starting in 1897. He served as President for three years. After serving as commissioner, Wight became a director in the Alpha Portland Cement Company and was later made the general manager of the firm's New York office. He retired in 1921.

Personal life
Wight married Anna Kumler. They had one son: Goulding K. Wight.

Around 1904, Wight moved to Montclair, New Jersey. In June 1922 he was struck by a truck in New York City and the injuries from that crash led to his death. He died on March 31, 1923, at his home in Montclair. He was interred at Oak Hill Cemetery in Washington, D.C.

References

1853 births
1923 deaths
Mayors of Washington, D.C.
Members of the Board of Commissioners for the District of Columbia
People from Washington, D.C.
Burials at Oak Hill Cemetery (Washington, D.C.)
19th-century American politicians